Sir Velupillai Coomaraswamy, CMG (25 September 1892 – 13 November 1972) was a Ceylonese civil servant and diplomat. He served as the Ceylonese High Commissioner to Canada and Ceylonese Envoy to Burma.

Early life and family
Coomaraswamy was born on 25 September 1892. He was the son of Velupillai from Vaddukoddai in northern Ceylon. Coomaraswamy passed the London Interscience Examination after school.

Coomaraswamy married Thayalnayaki, daughter of M. Sinnathamby. After Thayalnayaki's death he married Nesamani, daughter of J. T. Bartlett.

Civil service career
Coomaraswamy worked as teacher before joining the Ceylon Civil Service in 1913. As a cadet, he served in the Puttalam Kachcheri and the Anduradhapura Kachcheri. He was Police Magistrate and District Judge in Puttalam, Negombo, Kegalle and Panadura, thereafter served as the District Judge, Kegalle. He was then Assistant Government Agent in Kegalle, Puttalam and Hambantota. He was assigned to the State Council of Ceylon, serving as Clerk of the State Council and Secretary to the Board of Ministers from 1932 to 1933.  In 1933, he was posted as Acting Government Agent, Eastern Province.  He was then appointed Additional Registrar General, Registrar General, acting Commissioner of Lands, acting conservator of Forests, Food Controller, Controller of Import, Exports and Exchange, Government Agent, Eastern Province in 1945.  In late 1945, he served as of representative of the Government of Ceylon in Malaya.  He was the Government Agent for the Western Province from January 1946 to December 1947.  He was appointed Permanent Secretary to the Ministry of Home Affairs and Rural Development. He was the first native Government Agent of the Western province.

Diplomatic career
Coomaraswamy served as the Deputy Ceylonese High Commissioner in London in 1948.  In 1953, he was appointed Ceylonese Minister and Envoy Extraordinary in Rangoon and thereafter he was appointed Ceylonese High Commissioner in Ottawa in 1958. Coomaraswamy died on 13 November 1972.

Honours 
Coomaraswamy was made a Companion of the Order of St Michael and St George (CMG) in the 1947 Birthday Honours. He was knighted in the 1952 New Year Honours as a Knights Bachelor.

See also
Sri Lankan Non Career Diplomats

References

1892 births
1972 deaths
High Commissioners of Sri Lanka to Canada
Ambassadors of Sri Lanka to Myanmar
Permanent secretaries of Sri Lanka
Government Agents (Sri Lanka)
Ceylonese Companions of the Order of St Michael and St George
Ceylonese Knights Bachelor
People from Northern Province, Sri Lanka
People from British Ceylon
Sri Lankan Tamil civil servants
Sri Lankan diplomats
Sri Lankan Tamil teachers
Tamil people